Priming effect may refer to:
Priming (psychology)
Priming effect (soil ecology).